Club Deportivo Peña Azagresa is a Spanish football team based in Azagra in the autonomous community of Navarre. Founded in 1925, it plays in Tercera División – Group 15. Its stadium is Estadio Miguel Sola with a capacity of 2,000 seats.

Season to season

6 seasons in Tercera División

References

External links
Official Website  
navarrafutbolclic.com profile  
futnavarra.es profile

Football clubs in Navarre
Association football clubs established in 1925
1925 establishments in Spain